KTTT (1510 AM, "AM 1510 K Triple T") is a radio station broadcasting a classic country format. Licensed to Columbus, Nebraska, United States, the station is currently owned by Alpha Media, through licensee Alpha 3E Licensee, LLC.

In the mid-1960s, the station became an early radio home for Joe Siedlik's Big Joe Polka Show, which aired on the station for four decades.

References

External links

TTT
News and talk radio stations in the United States
Companies based in Platte County, Nebraska
TTT
Alpha Media radio stations